The Mobile Legends: Bang Bang Professional League, (abbreviation: MPL), better known as MPL Indonesia or MPL-ID, is a regional professional esports league for the game Mobile Legends: Bang Bang in Indonesia. MPL-ID serves as the direct qualifying tournament for Indonesian teams for the Mobile Legends: Bang Bang Southeast Asia Cup (MSC Cup) and the Mobile Legends: Bang Bang World Championship (M-World Championships).

Holding its inaugural season in 2018, there have been four teams that have been crowned Champions among the 30 teams that have been part of MPL Indonesia since its 2018. Team NXL won the very first championship, beating out EVOS Legends and ONIC Esports clinching its third MPL Indonesia Title after defeating RRQ Hoshi in the Grand Finals of MPL Indonesia Season 10, tying both RRQ and ONIC to have the most-titles for any team in MPL Indonesia at 3 titles each.

MPL Indonesia is split into two seasons per year, once during the summer and once during the latter months of the year. MPL Indonesia, along with MPL Philippines, is a franchised-based league, meaning the following eight teams that competes in each season, are franchises that are legally able to compete in MPL Indonesia tournaments. MPL Indonesia also has a lower-league for developing players named MDL Indonesia, wherein the same eight franchise teams have their own respective MDL Teams.

ONIC Esports are the current MPL Indonesia champions, defeating the RRQ Hoshi. Both ONIC and RRQ are representing Indonesia in the upcoming MLBB M4 World Championship.

History 
The first MPL Indonesia tournament was held in 2018 at the Revival Studio where the first Regular Season was held. Venues changed as the tournament had gained massive popularity within the Indonesian community. Some of the most-prominent teams in Mobile Legends have competed since Season 1 such as RRQ and EVOS.

During the COVID-19 pandemic, MPL Indonesia Season 5, so did other regions such as the Philippines and Malaysia, cancelled its in-person attendance for the tournament and followed an offline format to ensure the safety of the fans and the people working on set. All regions slowly opened up at the beginning of MPL Season 9.

Season 1 (2018) 
MPL Indonesia hosted the first tournament with 10 qualifying teams slated to compete. These teams are RRQ.O2 (Now RRQ Hoshi), Louvre Esports, Team Rev Indo, EVOS Legends, Team NXL, Bigetron Player Kill (Now Bigetron Alpha), Pandora Esports, Domino's Hunters, Saints Indo 2 and Elite 8 Critical Reborn. 

Being considered as a dark-horse team, Team NXL was able to win the very first season of MPL Indonesia, defeating EVOS Legends 3-2.

Season 2 (2018) 
The Second season was held during the latter years of 2018. The second season featured a new set of teams such as SFI Esports, Team Capcorn, Boom JR, ONIC Esports and Aerowolf Roxy with teams such as RRQ.O2, EVOS, Bigetron Esports and Louvre Esports returning. However, Despite finishing to a 3-2 defeat against Team NXL, EVOS Legends would once again finish second to the eventual champions RRQ.O2, defeating EVOS in a 3-0 sweep.

Season 3 (2019) 
The third season of MPL Indonesia was highlighted to be an event where the Champions and the Runner-up teams would Qualify to represent Indonesia to the Mobile Legends: Bang Bang Southeast Asia Cup of 2019, better known as MSC 2019. ONIC Esports was able to defeat Louvre Esports in the Grand Finals after ONIC finished an undefeated run in the Regular Season, going 11-0 (22-4). After a dominant showing in MPL Indonesia, ONIC Esports was also able to clinch the MSC 2019 title in Manila.

Season 4 (2019) 
The Fourth Season of MPL Indonesia was also highlighted to be the tournament to determine Indonesia's representatives for the very first Mobile Legends: Bang Bang World Championship, better known as the M1 World Championships which was held in Kuala Lumpur. Long time rival teams EVOS Legends and RRQ Hoshi was able to represent Indonesia in the upcoming World Championship with EVOS Legends taking the MPL Indonesia Season 4 Championship Title.

Both RRQ Hoshi and EVOS Legends would take on a rematch in the Grand Finals of the M1 World Championships with EVOS winning the Upper-Bracket Finals while RRQ Hoshi crawling back from the Lower-Brackets. However, after a fierce 7-game series, EVOS was able to win the very first M1 World Title.

MPL Indonesia Season 4 was also the very first tournament in MPL Indonesia history where a Franchise-Based System would be implemented, therefore removing all qualifying tournaments to qualify for MPL.

Season 5 (2020) 
MPL Indonesia Season 5 was the very first MPL Season that was played during the Covid-19 pandemic. Despite posing as a strong adversary and having high expectations to be the first team to win back-to-back Championship titles, EVOS Legends was unable to defeat RRQ Hoshi in another rematch against their foe, sealing the trilogy's results. RRQ Hoshi was able to defeat EVOS in a 3-2 series.

Season 6 (2020) 
MPL Indonesia Season 6 was the second season in MPL Indonesia to be played during the Covid-19 pandemic. Season 6 became the third season for MPL Indonesia to be part of the Franchise-based system, hence decreasing the number of teams from twelve from Season 4 to eight. MPL Indonesia Season 5 was also played under the franchise-based system. RRQ Hoshi was able to defeat Alter-Ego Esports in a fierce Best-of-5 Matchup in the Grand Finals that saw RRQ Hoshi become the first team in MPL Indonesia history to achieve a back-to-back championship title run.

Both RRQ Hoshi and Alter Ego Esports qualified for the M2 World Championships in Singapore. The World Championship was delayed due to the Covid-19 pandemic that Southeast Asian countries have suffered through. However, RRQ Hoshi and Alter Ego Esports were denied a chance in the Grand Finals matchup with Bren Esports of the Philippines defeating Myanmar representatives Burmese Ghouls and giving the Philippines its first World Title.

Season 7 (2021) 
MPL Indonesia Season 7 featured the final appearance of the team Aerowolf Pro Team who will subsequently fold its team and roster in Season 8. Season 7 was another highlighted tournament that would qualify the champions and the runner-up of Indonesia to the MSC Cup 2021 tournament which was held offline.

Despite having the chance to attain a never-done-before three-peat in MPL Indonesia, RRQ Hoshi was unexpectedly eliminated in the early stages of the playoffs with Alter-Ego Esports suffering the same fate. M1 World Champions EVOS Legends was able to win their second MPL Indonesia Championship title since Season 4 against Bigetron Alpha and both teams qualified for MSC.

Despite garnering support to be the favorites to win the tournament, EVOS Legends and Bigetron Alpha were unable to pull-off significant victories against rising regions such as the Philippines, Cambodia and Malaysia. This came after Bigetron Alpha suffered a 0-3 standing finish in the group stages but EVOS maintaining a 2-0 lead. Both EVOS and Bigetron were eliminated from attaining the MSC 2021 Cup. An All-Philippine Grand Finals ensued with Execration (now Smart Omega) winning against MPL-PH S7's champions Blacklist International.

Season 8 (2021) 
MPL Indonesia Season 8 was another highlighted season as it saw the qualifications for the champions and runner-up for the MLBB M3 World Championships. It was also the first tournament where all teams in MPL Indonesia was able to qualify for the first MPL Invitational. Despite having upset finishes in the recent seasons, ONIC Esports was able to pull off a fierce 7-game-series Grand Finals against RRQ Hoshi, giving ONIC its second MPL Indonesia Title. ONIC was the third team to attain such a feat.

Both ONIC and RRQ are qualified for the M3 World Championships. However, ONIC Esports would defeat MPL Philippines Season 8 Champions, and back-to-back champions Blacklist International to a 3-1 series in the MPL Invitational 2021. Despite the victory, ONIC Esports would be eliminated earlier than usual in the lower-bracket matchup against Blacklist International, who was defeated in a 3-2 series against BloodThirstyKings (BTK). Blacklist sent ONIC Esports home in a 2-1 victory. RRQ Hoshi would suffer the same fate in the Lower-Brackets, getting eliminated by Blacklist International in a 3-0 series in the Lower-Bracket Quarterfinals.

M3 showed the Indonesian team's worst performance in the world stages thus far.

Season 9 (2022) 
MPL Indonesia Season 9 became the first edition of the tournament that saw in-person attendance in the MPL Arena where the regular season and playoffs were held. Season 9 would however, not allow fans to attend during Weeks 1 and 2 due to health protocols provided by the Indonesian Government. Season 9 became a dominating challenge for the defending Champions ONIC Esports that saw them able to repeat their MPL Title after qualifying for the grand finals. But, it was shut down by RRQ Hoshi, who won their fourth MPL Indonesia Championship title, the first and only team thus far to attain such feat.

RRQ and ONIC would once again represent Indonesia in the MSC 2022 Cup tournament in Kuala Lumpur, the first regional tournament to be held with an attendance of fans. ONIC was unable to qualify to the playoffs after a poor showing during the group stages. However, RRQ was able to beat all odds to dominate its Group along with the Philippines' powerhouse team Smart Omega.

RRQ Hoshi was able to qualify for the Grand Finals in the upper-bracket, defeating MPL Philippines Season 9 champions RSG Philippines but would be defeated once again by RSG in the Grand Finals in a 4-0 sweep.

Season 10 (2022) 
MPL Indonesia Season 10 would become one of the most memorable seasons that MPL Indonesia has ever produced after it had introduced its first massive importation of players from the Philippines. M3 World Championships runner-up ONIC Philippines have released their players and many of them would go on to play overseas. 

In Season 10, the play style of most teams have relatively changed to fit in a Filipino-play style of gameplay as the Philippines have been the powerhouse of Mobile Legends since their victory in major international tournaments thus far. RRQ Hoshi and ONIC Esports would once again meet in the MPL Indonesia Grand Finals for the third consecutive season.

The trilogy of both RRQ and ONIC would finish with ONIC Esports defeating RRQ Hoshi 4-1 in the Grand Finals with Kairi taking Finals MVP honors. Both RRQ and ONIC would once again represent Indonesia in the upcoming MLBB M4 World Championships in Jakarta.

Current Teams and Rosters 

Reference:

Champions List

See also 

 MPL Philippines
 Mobile Legends: Bang Bang
 Mobile Legends: Bang Bang Southeast Asia Cup
 Mobile Legends: Bang Bang World Championship

References 

Mobile Legends: Bang Bang competitions